The FIFA World Cup, is an international association football competition contested by the men's national teams of the members of Fédération Internationale de Football Association (FIFA), the sport's global governing body. The championship has been awarded every four years since the first tournament in 1930, except in 1942 and 1946, due to World War II.

The tournament consists of two parts, the qualification phase and the final phase (officially called the World Cup Finals). The qualification phase, which currently take place over the three years preceding the Finals, is used to determine which teams qualify for the Finals. The current format of the Finals involves 32 teams competing for the title, at venues within the host nation (or nations) over a period of about a month. The World Cup Finals is the most widely viewed sporting event in the world, with an estimated 715.1 million people watching the 2006 tournament final.

Nigeria has reached the FIFA World Cup on six occasions, the first being in 1994 where they reached the second round. Their sixth and most recent appearance was the 2018 FIFA World Cup in Russia.

FIFA World Cup record

Notes

By Opponent

By match

Squads

Record players

Top goalscorers

References

External links
Nigeria at FIFA
World Cup Finals Statistics

Countries at the FIFA World Cup
 
World Cup